Battery Milk  is the first album by Mike Dillon's Go-Go Jungle. The album includes experimental, funk and jazz.

Musicians 
 Go-Go Ray - drums
 JJ Jungle - bass, vocals
 Ron Johnson - bass
 Mike Dillon - vibraphone, tabla, percussion, vocals 
 Mark Southerland - saxophone, eight track, bent circuits

Track listing 
 "Go-Go's Theme"
 "Broc's Last Stand"
 "The Blame Game"
 "Robbing the Bank"
 "Your Mother Was My Teacher"
 "The Voyeur"
 "Lunatic Express"
 "Hercules"
 "Lopsided Melon Ball"
 "Stupid Americans"
 "Bad Man"
 "Harris County"

References 
Album's liner notes

2007 albums
Jazz albums by American artists
Go-go albums